Promontorium Agassiz is a mountainous cape situated on the northeast margin of Mare Imbrium on the near side of the Moon.  Its selenographic coordinates are 42.4° N, 1.77° E.  It is located south of Promontorium Deville and Mons Blanc, northeast of Mons Piton, and northwest of Cassini crater.

Promontorium Agassiz is named after Jean Louis Rodolphe Agassiz, a Swiss zoologist and geologist. The name of the feature was approved by the IAU in 1935.

References

External links

 LAC-25, a map showing Promontorium Agassiz and surrounding area

Mountains on the Moon